Liga Primer Indonesia (LPI, sometimes translated to English as Indonesian Premier League) was an Indonesian independent football league held in 2011. It was managed by Konsorsium Liga Premier Indonesia and PT Liga Primer Indonesia and was not recognized (initially) by the PSSI. Nineteen clubs took part in its inaugural and only season which was running from January to May 2011. The first kick-off was held on 8 January 2011 in Manahan Stadium, Solo, Central Java. Despite its original full-season schedule, the league was then stopped during the half-season break when Persebaya 1927 was currently leading the table.

History
On 17 September 2010, twenty Indonesian football clubs together with the Indonesian National Football Reform Movement (GRSNI) issued a declaration in Jenggala Graha, Jakarta. It was led by Arifin Panigoro, a local businessman. The declaration was related to the concerns of the declining state of the national football.

The clubs then took a joint initiative to establish and declare Liga Primer Indonesia (LPI) in Semarang on 24 October 2010, with 17 clubs (out of 20) expressing their will to participate.

The spirit of each clubs in building Liga Primer Indonesia were designed as a commitment to improve the standard of football, both organizationally and financially. The league views that the system of capital assistance and revenue sharing system in Liga Primer Indonesia could make clubs "financially independent and professional in management."

To achieve independence, Liga Primer Indonesia provided assistance forms of the initial capital for each participating club. With this assistance, the clubs are expected to run without dependent from local government budget (APBD). The initial capital will vary between clubs according to the audit results that have been held. Additionally, the LPI embraces the principle of division of revenues in a transparent and accountable to the club participants. According to agreement with the club, LPI revenue sharing would be based on two schemes, namely schemes to league revenues (e.g.: sponsor the league, broadcasting rights, etc.) and schemes for income matches (e.g.: local sponsorship, broadcasting rights, tickets, etc.).

The inaugural (and only) season started on 8 January 2011. Before, LPI hosted a pre-season competition in Bogor, Solo and Semarang.

On 11 April 2011, the FIFA Normalisation Committee charged with running Indonesian football officially recognized Liga Primer Indonesia, allowing the competition and all players involved to be officially recognized by PSSI as well as FIFA and eligible to play in the national team. The league was officially disbanded in August 2011, with last match being held in May; all clubs in it merged with those already in Indonesian Premier League, which used the same acronym in both Indonesian and English, although most of the clubs created specifically for the league disbanded almost immediately.

Teams
The only LPI season featured 19 teams, four of the 19 were defected from PSSI sanctioned league of whom three (PSM Makassar, Persema Malang and Persibo Bojonegoro) defected from the top tier Indonesia Super League, and Persebaya from the second tier Liga Indonesia Premier Division.

Stadium and locations

Personnel and kits
Note: Flags indicate national team as has been defined under FIFA eligibility rules. Players and Managers may hold more than one non-FIFA nationality.

Managerial changes

Foreign players

In this league each club is allowed to sign five foreign players. The five foreign players can come from any confederation. Foreign players who have Indonesian descent or parents were considered as local players.

Sponsors
 Bank Saudara
 Indosiar 
 Coca-Cola
 Microsoft

League table

Results

Top scorers

See also
 Liga Primer Indonesia Pre-season Tournament
 Liga Primer Indonesia Central Java Governor Cup
 Indonesian football league system
 Indonesia Super League
 Piala Indonesia

References

External links
 Official website
 Unofficial Site

 
Defunct football leagues in Indonesia
Liga Primer Indonesia